The Women's 800 metres event at the 2002 European Athletics Indoor Championships was held on 2–3 March.

Medalists

Results

Heats
The winner of each heat (Q) and the next 3 fastest (q) qualified for the semi-finals.

Final

References
Results

800 metres at the European Athletics Indoor Championships
800
2002 in women's athletics